John Joseph McNaught (November 22, 1921 – January 24, 1994) was a United States district judge of the United States District Court for the District of Massachusetts.

Education and career

Born in Malden, Massachusetts, McNaught graduated from Malden Catholic High School in 1939. He received a Bachelor of Arts degree from Boston College in 1943 and was in the United States Army for the remainder of World War II, from 1943 to 1946. He received a Juris Doctor from Boston College Law School in 1949. He was in private practice in Malden from 1949 to 1950, and was then a law clerk to Judge William T. McCarthy of the United States District Court for the District of Massachusetts from 1950 to 1954, thereafter returning to private practice in Boston until 1972. He was an associate justice of the Superior Court of the Commonwealth of Massachusetts from 1972 to 1979.

Federal judicial service

On January 25, 1979, McNaught was nominated by President Jimmy Carter to a new seat on the United States District Court for the District of Massachusetts created by 92 Stat. 1629. He was confirmed by the United States Senate on March 21, 1979, and received his commission on March 23, 1979. McNaught served in that capacity until his retirement on February 1, 1991.

Post-judicial service
From 1991 to 1994 he was in private practice in Melrose.

Death

McNaught died of pneumonia on January 24, 1994, at Melrose-Wakefield Hospital in Melrose, Massachusetts.

References

Sources
 

1921 births
1994 deaths
Massachusetts state court judges
Boston College Law School alumni
Boston College alumni
Judges of the United States District Court for the District of Massachusetts
United States district court judges appointed by Jimmy Carter
20th-century American judges
United States Army officers
20th-century American lawyers
United States Army personnel of World War II
Massachusetts lawyers
People from Melrose, Massachusetts
People from Malden, Massachusetts